The 2017 Scottish Women's Premier League Cup was the 16th edition of the SWPL Cup competition, which began in 2002. The competition was to be contested by all 16 teams of the two divisions of the Scottish Women's Premier League (SWPL 1 and SWPL 2).

First round 
draw for the first round was made on 10 February 2017

Quarter-finals

Semi-finals 

The draw for the semi finals was held on 29 March 2017 at Hampden Park

Final
The final was played on Sunday 26 May 2017 at the Broadwood Stadium, Cumbernauld
Hibernian won the final 4-1 against Celtic, It was their second Scottish Woman's Premier League Cup win in a row

External links
 at soccerway.com

References

1
Scot
Scot
Scottish Women's Premier League seasons